The automotive aftermarket is the secondary market of the automotive industry, concerned with the manufacturing, remanufacturing, distribution, retailing, and installation of all vehicle parts, chemicals, equipment, and accessories, after the sale of the automobile by the original equipment manufacturer (OEM) to the consumer. The parts, accessories, etc. for sale may or may not be manufactured by the OEM. According to a report by the International Trade Administration in the US Department of Commerce, "Aftermarket parts are divided into two categories: replacement parts and accessories. Replacement parts are automotive parts built or remanufactured to replace OE parts as they become worn or damaged. Accessories are parts made for comfort, convenience, performance, safety, or customization, and are designed for add-on after the original sale of the motor vehicle."

The aftermarket encompasses parts for replacement, collision, appearance, and performance. The aftermarket provides a wide variety of parts of varying qualities and prices for nearly all vehicle makes and models.

Consumers have the option of repairing their vehicles themselves (the "do-it-yourself" or "DIY" segment) or can take the vehicle to a professional repair facility (the "do-it-for me" or "DIFM" segment).
The aftermarket helps keep vehicles on the road by providing consumers the choice of where they want their vehicles serviced, maintained, or customized.

Size of the automotive aftermarket
The United States automotive aftermarket is estimated to be worth $383 billion (2020), contributing more than 2.3% to GDP.  The aftermarket employs 4.4 million people who work at manufacturers, distributors, retailers and repair shops.  

In the United States, online sales of aftermarket accessories have showed year over year increases over traditional brick and mortar stores. In fact, according to Hedges & Company, "Online revenue for automotive parts eCommerce revenue will reach $38 billion in 2022 in the US." That includes $19.8 billion from first-party 1P eCommerce websites and $18.3 billion from third-party 3P marketplaces. 

Singapore, which does not have a domestic automobile industry, is an especially important destination for businesses exporting automotive parts and accessories due to its high automobile turnover stemming from the peculiarities of its driving laws. (In short, car owners are legally required to get rid of their cars after ten years of use and Singapore's compensation scheme to offset the registration fee of new cars has incentivized more frequent turnover.)

High automobile turnover and the preference for new parts means that the market for remanufactured and reconditioned auto parts is very small. Combined with a high demand for "accessories, car-care products, prestige items, and new spare parts," Singapore's automotive aftermarket is large. In fact, Singapore has become a major automotive components manufacturing base, as several leading multinational corporations (MNCs) have established international procurement offices as well as their Southeast Asia distribution centers.

In Canada, the automotive aftermarket is a C$19.4 billion industry that employs about 420,000 people.

In Australia, the automotive aftermarket industry in 2013 was estimated to generate a AUD$5.2 billion turnover, with 21000 staff, and 1400 manufacturers. 

in Europe, the total volume of Independent Aftermarket (IAM) amounted to 127 billion Euros in 2015 (end-user prices without labor and tax). At that moment there were 54 parts traders with annual turnover over 100 mio Euros in Europe, 6 of them exceeded 1 billion Euros. 
 
Meeting platform for the international automotive aftermarket is the B2B trade fair Automechanika which takes place every two years in Frankfurt. At last edition the hot topics were connected cars, autonomous driving, alternative drives and the workshop of the future.

Online versus brick-and-mortar aftermarket accessory vendors
Among online retailers, Amazon.com and eBay Motors are the largest sellers of aftermarket parts and accessories in the U.S. by both units sold and revenue, and are expected to grow 25% in 2014, far outstripping traditional chain stores.
 
As DIY parts sales soften at the retail counter, chain stores have pushed themselves into the DIFM commercial business, eating into distributors’ and wholesalers’ market share. Since 2007, DIY sales at the chain stores have fallen a total of 3% to 5%, while commercial sales have brought in a double-digit sales increase. AutoZone’s DIFM sales in 2013 alone increased over 13%.

Online sales of auto parts and accessories in the United States, excluding online auctions and used parts, have been projected to pass $10 billion in 2018.

Legal issues
Automobile manufacturers have attempted to hinder or suppress automotive aftermarket sales by means of copyright or patent infringement litigation. For example, in British Leyland Motor Corp. v Armstrong Patents Co. in the UK, the House of Lords decided in 1986 that Leyland could not claim copyright infringement in order to prevent the aftermarket sale of replacement tailpipes to purchasers of those motor cars.

Aro Mfg. Co. v. Convertible Top Replacement Co. is a 1961 U.S. Supreme Court case in which the Court redefined the U.S. patent law doctrine of repair and reconstruction: "No element, not itself separately patented, that constitutes one of the elements of a combination patent is entitled to patent monopoly, however essential it may be to the patented combination and no matter how costly or difficult replacement may be."

In 2005 Harley-Davidson filed a patent and trademark infringement lawsuit against two aftermarket engine manufacturers producing drop-in replacements for Harley's engines, namely S&S Cycle and Delkron, Inc. Harley accused S&S and Delkron of copying parts for Twin Cam engines and using Harley trademarks without permission. S&S argued that the suit was without any legal basis, and asserted that "a mutually beneficial relationship existed" between them and Harley.

See also 
Aftermarket exhaust parts

References

Automotive accessories
Automotive industry
Electric vehicle conversion
Vehicle modification